Qui squadra mobile is an Italian television series starring Orazio Orlando and Luigi Vannucchi. All 12 episodes were directed by Anton Giulio Majano and written by Massimo Felisatti, Anton Giulio Majano, and Fabio Pittorru.

See also
List of Italian television series

External links
 

Italian television series
1973 Italian television series debuts
1976 Italian television series endings
1970s Italian television series
RAI original programming